Nikita Vladimirovich Shershnyov (born 19 October 2001) is a Russian football player. He plays for Kazakhstani club FC Maktaaral.

Club career
He made his debut in the Russian Professional Football League for FC Krasnodar-3 on 27 August 2018 in a game against PFC Spartak Nalchik. He made his Russian Football National League debut for FC Krasnodar-2 on 19 October 2019 in a game against FC Mordovia Saransk.

References

External links
 

2001 births
Sportspeople from Taganrog
Living people
Russian footballers
Russia youth international footballers
Association football forwards
FC Krasnodar-2 players
FC Mashuk-KMV Pyatigorsk players
FC Ordabasy players
Russian Second League players
Russian First League players
Kazakhstan Premier League players
Russian expatriate footballers
Expatriate footballers in Kazakhstan
Russian expatriate sportspeople in Kazakhstan